Claus Wiese (March 1, 1924 – September 7, 1987) was a Norwegian actor and American-based radio broadcaster.

Wiese was born in Lillestrøm. He graduated from the Oslo Cathedral School in 1944 and worked as an actor with the Oslo New Theater from 1945 to 1951. Wiese debuted in the film Englandsfarere in 1946. He married an American, Joan Ann Trapp, on August 12, 1950. Wiese worked as a film editor at the TV station WNAC in Boston, Massachusetts from 1952 to 1954, was head of programming at WMTW in Poland Spring, Maine from 1954 to 1975 and business director at the same station from 1975 to 1982, and became the station manager at WMTV in Auburn, Maine in 1982.

In 1961, he and his wife moved to Bethel, Maine, where they owned and operated the Norseman Inn for 25 years.

Claus Wiese was the brother of the author and former administrative director at J.W. Cappelens Forlag Jan Wiese. He was the uncle of the television talk show host Claus Wiese.

Filmography
 1946: Englandsfarere
 1947: Sankt Hans fest
 1948: Operation Swallow: The Battle for Heavy Water
 1949: Love Wins Out  (Swedish)
 1949: Death is a Caress
 1951: Alt dette - og Island også
 1951: Dei svarte hestane

References

1924 births
1987 deaths
Norwegian male stage actors
Norwegian male film actors
20th-century Norwegian male actors
People from Lillestrøm